Yorktown Memorial Hospital in Texas was built in 1951 and was run by the Felician Sisters of The Roman Catholic Church.  It closed as a hospital in 1986, when it became a drug rehab facility until its total decommission in 1992.

History 
A religious group called the "Felician Sisters" were women who worked alongside the Roman Catholic Church from 1855, the year they were founded. These women were "inspired by the lives of Saint Francis of Assisi, Saint Clare, Saint Felix of Cantalic, and Blessed Mary Angela" to help those in need through dutiful service and care.

During the 1950s, during the Korean War, the idea of building a hospital in Yorktown stemmed from the lack of one in the immediate area, the closest hospital being in San Antonio, Texas. The money used came from fundraisers and donations and grants from companies such as the Ford Motor Company.

Franciscan hospitals
Buildings and structures in DeWitt County, Texas
Hospitals established in 1951
Hospitals disestablished in 1980
Defunct hospitals in Texas
Catholic hospitals in North America
1951 establishments in Texas